Sarnevo is a village in Radnevo Municipality, in Stara Zagora Province, in southeastern Bulgaria.

References

Villages in Karnobat Municipality